Darren Dwayn Aaron Mitchell is a Trinidadian international footballer who last played for Central F.C. of the TT Pro League  as a midfielder. He is currently a free agent.

Early life and career
Mitchell was born on 10 January 1990 in Princes Town in the island of Trinidad where he spent his early years but identifies himself as a Tobagonian having several relatives and friends in Tobago. He attended the Scarborough Secondary.

Club career
It was during his time attending the secondary school when he started his football career and joined the Tobago Phoenix under coach Terry William's request. During the January/December window of the 2012-13 TT Pro League, Mitchell moved to Central F.C.

In March 2017, Mitchell was reportedly signed in by Davao Aguilas F.C. of the Philippines Football League. He unfortunately, was released by the club before the beginning of the season.

Mitchell later reportedly moved to Guatemalan club Deportivo Guastatoya in June 2017.

International career
In March 2013, Mitchell earned his first call up for the Trinidad and Tobago national football team. By March 2017, Mitchell has already made three caps for Trinidad and Tobago, all in friendlies.

References

1990 births
People from Tobago
Living people
Association football midfielders
Trinidad and Tobago footballers
Trinidad and Tobago international footballers
Central F.C. players
TT Pro League players
Trinidad and Tobago expatriate footballers
Trinidad and Tobago expatriate sportspeople in Guatemala
Expatriate footballers in Guatemala